Aspen Hill (also, Aspenhill) is an unincorporated community in Giles County, Tennessee, United States. It lies at an elevation of 653 feet (199 m).

History

A post office called Aspen Hill was established in 1860, and remained in operation until it was discontinued in 1952. The community was named from the presence of aspen trees in the area.

References

Unincorporated communities in Tennessee
Unincorporated communities in Giles County, Tennessee